Kansas City Kansas Community College (KCKCC) is a public two year community college in Wyandotte County, Kansas, United States. The college is accredited by the Higher Learning Commission, a commission of the North Central Association and the Kansas Board of Regents.

History
Kansas City Kansas Community College was founded in 1923 as part of the Public School System of Kansas City, Kansas. In 1965, in accordance with legislation governing two-year colleges in the State of Kansas, the name of the college changed to Kansas City Kansas Junior College. In 1979, legislative action created another name change for the two-year colleges in the state. The term "junior" was dropped from their names and replaced with "community"; at this time the college officially became known as Kansas City Kansas Community College.

Buildings
The main buildings of KCKCC are all dedicated to someone who was an important part of KCKCC's history.

Athletics
The official mascot for the Kansas City Kansas Community College is the Blue Devils. The college has 8 sports. They participate in the National Junior College Athletic Association (NJCAA) and the Kansas Jayhawk Community College Conference. The women's basketball team won the NJCAA Division II Women's Basketball National Championship in 2016 and 2019.

Notable alumni
 Damion Barry, track & field medalist
 David E. Bruns, judge of the Kansas Court of Appeals
 Tom Burroughs, current member of the Kansas House of Representatives
 Mark Jelks, track & field medalist
 Sam Kass, NBC News senior food analyst and former president Barack Obama's Senior Policy Advisor for Nutrition Policy,
 Sherridan Kirk, track & field medalist
 Quincy Morgan, former professional football player
 Cindy Neighbor, former member of the Kansas House of Representatives
 Irene C. Peden, first American woman engineer or scientist to conduct research in the Antarctic
 David Segui, former professional baseball player
 Kevin Young, former professional baseball player
 Valdenia Winn, former member of the Kansas House of Representatives

References

External links
 

Buildings and structures in Kansas City, Kansas
Community colleges in Kansas
Educational institutions established in 1923
Two-year colleges in the United States
Education in Wyandotte County, Kansas
NJCAA athletics
1923 establishments in Kansas